GDNF family receptor alpha-1 (GFRα1), also known as the GDNF receptor, is a protein that in humans is encoded by the GFRA1 gene.

Function 

Glial cell line-derived neurotrophic factor (GDNF) and neurturin (NTN) are two structurally related, potent neurotrophic factors that play key roles in the control of neuron survival and differentiation. The protein encoded by this gene is a member of the GDNF receptor family. It is a glycosylphosphatidylinositol(GPI)-linked cell surface receptor for both GDNF and NTN, and mediates activation of the RET tyrosine kinase receptor. This gene is a candidate gene for Hirschsprung disease. Two alternatively spliced transcript variants encoding different isoforms have been described for this gene.

Interactions 

GDNF family receptor alpha 1 has been shown to interact with GDNF and RET proto-oncogene.

See also 
 GFRα

References

Further reading

External links